Evelyn Foster Shannon (September 14, 1890 – died January 28, 1973) was a politician in Manitoba, Canada.  He served in the Legislative Assembly of Manitoba as a Liberal-Progressive representative from 1936 to 1945.

Shannon worked as an insurance agent, and was the mayor of Transcona before becoming a Member of the Legislative Assembly.

He was nominated as the Liberal-Progressive candidate in Springfield after Clifford Barclay, the sitting member, chose not to run again.  He won the nomination with 67 votes, against 22 for M.J. Hoban of Beausejour and 24 for John Lysecki of Elma.  In the general election, he defeated Social Credit candidate L.J. Pulfer by 376 votes.  In the parliament that followed, Shannon served as a backbench supporter of John Bracken's government.

Shannon was narrowly re-elected in the 1941 provincial election, defeating Social Credit candidate Alex McLeod by only forty-six votes.  He did not seek re-election in 1945.

There is currently an Evelyn Shannon Place in Winnipeg.

References

1890 births
1973 deaths
Manitoba Liberal Party MLAs